Samuel Phillips aka Wombat is an Australian rapper from Tasmania. His debut studio album What Death Tastes Like was released in September 2022 and peaked at #2 on the overall ARIA Charts and peaked at #1 for Hip-Hop albums ARIA Charts.

A single released with Wombat and frequent collaborator Chillinit was certified gold by the Arias.

Discography

Albums

Extended plays

References

Australian male rappers
Musicians from Tasmania
Date of birth missing (living people)
Living people
Year of birth missing (living people)